Robert Wolfe Brooks (Washington, D.C., September 16, 1952 – Montreal, September 5, 2002) was a mathematician known for his work in spectral geometry, Riemann surfaces, circle packings, and differential geometry.

He received his Ph.D. from Harvard University in 1977; his thesis, The smooth cohomology of groups of diffeomorphisms, was written under the supervision of Raoul Bott.  He worked at the University of Maryland (1979–1984), then at the University of Southern California, and then, from 1995, at the Technion in Haifa.

Work

In an influential paper , Brooks proved that the bounded cohomology of a topological space is isomorphic to the bounded cohomology of its fundamental group.

Honors

Alfred P. Sloan fellowship
Guastella fellowship

Selected publications

 
 
 
 
Reviewer Maung Min-Oo for MathSciNet wrote: "This is a well written survey article on the construction of isospectral manifolds which are not isometric with emphasis on hyperbolic Riemann surfaces of constant negative curvature."
Brooks, Robert, "Form in Topology", The Magicians of Form, ed. by Robert M. Weiss.  Laurelhurst Publications, 2003.

References

External links 
 Memorial page (Technion)
 

20th-century American mathematicians
21st-century American mathematicians
20th-century American Jews
1952 births
2002 deaths
American emigrants to Israel
Harvard Graduate School of Arts and Sciences alumni
Israeli Jews
Israeli mathematicians
Academic staff of Technion – Israel Institute of Technology
University of Southern California faculty
Mathematicians from Washington, D.C.
Differential geometers
Topologists
Sloan Research Fellows
21st-century American Jews